The Ghent Student Regatta is a boat race for students in April 2008 at Portus Ganda in the heart of historical Ghent in Dutch-speaking Flanders, Belgium, was in 2008 a common initiative of Paul Van Cauwenberge, the Rector of Ghent University, in collaboration with Ghent Students Rowing the sports department of the City and Patrick Rombaut, Umpiring Commission Chairman of the Fédération Internationale des Sociétés d'Aviron (FISA).

Rombaut started the Sprint idea at this location back in September 2007, where his regatta team of the annual May regatta of Ghent organised a race between the rowing teams of Christ Church Boat Club of Oxford University, Henley Rowing Club, a junior team of K.R. Club Gent/Royal Club Nautique de Gand and his own KR Sport Gent 1883 eight. The race was won in 1907 with the colours and blades of K.R.Sport Gent (Royal Sport Nautique de Gand = French name at that time) and they won again in 2007 in this 200m sprint.

The idea came from the Mercedes Benz FISA World Rowing Sprints at Serpentine Lake in Hyde Park in London back in 2002. It was also a trial to bring rowing into city centers again. 

There are plans to continue with the enlarged version of the event in every two or three years, in the same location.

Tradition 
British, Anglo-Saxon and also Dutch students have developed a much stronger rowing tradition. The Temple Challenge Cup and the Boat Race have been established as classic examples.

Two races  
The tournament was opened by an International sprint race in teams of eight by the University of Leiden, Magdalen College, Oxford and Trinity College, Cambridge and eight rowers from Ghent made out of two of the three local open associations. 
A mixed race. The National race in four, done by Sport Nautique Universitaire de Bruxelles, Limburg Association (Hasselt, near Maastricht) and Ghent Students Rowing, was previously a Belgian version of the Dutch so called Non-fanatical Competition — and Regional students rowing category, organised by their NSRF and the Nationaal Overleg Orgaan Competitieroeien (NOOC).

See also
 Students Rowing Flanders

References

External links
 Worldrowing of the International Rowing Federation FISA
 Christ Church Boat Club Oxford 
 Trinity Boat Club Cambridge U.K.
  Sprintrace Portus Ganda September 2007 (archived link, 26 July 2011)
  Schamper (students Magazine in Gent)
  Roeien in België Belgian Rowing portal
  Sprint KRSG Ghent 2007
  Destandaard.be, De Standaard
  About the Portus Ganda historical site
  Portus Ganda more Historic
  University of Ghent images archive
  City of Ghent archives
  Rector and option courses Rowing at UGent 
  Chairmen Patrick Rombaut Media4U
  Roeien in België - Patrick Rombaut

College sports rivalries
Ghent University
Rowing competitions in Belgium